Stephen Foster: America's Troubadour is a 1934 biography by John Tasker Howard that documents the life of American musician Stephen Collins Foster.

Reception
John W. Oliver of Pennsylvania History: A Journal of Mid-Atlantic Studies called Stephen Foster: America's Troubadour the "best biography of Stephen Foster yet written."

References

 
 

 
 
 

 

1934 non-fiction books
American biographies
Stephen Foster
English-language books
Biographies about musicians